"Something 4 the Weekend" is the third single by Super Furry Animals. The title track is a more mellow reworking of the song "Something For the Weekend" from the band's debut album Fuzzy Logic. The original version is included as the last track on the single. It reached #18 on the UK Singles Chart on its release in July 1996. "Something 4 The Weekend" replaces the original album version of the song on the American release of Fuzzy Logic.

The packaging of the single features a quote in Welsh, 'Bydded Ara deg mae dal iâr', which roughly translates into English as 'Slowly is the way to catch a chicken'.

Track listing

All songs by Super Furry Animals.
CD (CRESCD235)
"Something 4 the Weekend" – 2:52
"Waiting to Happen" – 2:15
"Arnofio/Glô in the Dark" – 3:57
"Something for the Weekend" – 2:32

Personnel
Gruff Rhys – vocals, guitar
Huw Bunford – guitar, backing vocals
Guto Pryce – bass guitar
Cian Ciaran – keyboards, backing vocals
Dafydd Ieuan – drums

Singles chart positions

References

Super Furry Animals songs
Creation Records singles
1996 singles
1996 songs